Central Hindu Military Education Society (CHME) is Indian educational society. It was founded by Dr. B. S. Moonje. The Central Hindu Military Education Society is considered a member of the Sangh Parivar group, an umbrella term for Hindu nationalist organisations led by the Rashtriya Swayamsevak Sangh (RSS) Dr. B. S. Moonje He established various types of military schools and colleges to empower the Indian youth.

The society is located in Nashik, Maharashtra. At present this institution enrolls in various types of courses.

Institutes recognised by the Society 
 Dr.Moonje Institute of Management & Computer Studies, Nashik
 Bhosala Military School, Nashik and Nagpur
 Bhosala Military School- Girls, Nashik
 Bhosala Military College, Nashik
 Vidya Prabodhini Prashala Marathi Madhyam, Nashik
 Shishu Vihar Balak Mandir Nashik
 Bhosala Adventure Foundation, Nashik
 Bhosala Krida Kendra, Nashik
 Bhonsala Institute of Technology, Nashik
 Bhonsala Institute of Nursing, Nashik
 Kanhoji Angre Maritime research Institute

References 

Hindutva
Hindu nationalism
Hindu organizations
Hindu organisations based in India
Hindu paramilitary organizations
Right-wing populism in India
Sangh Parivar
Hindu revivalists
Military schools in India
Boarding schools in Maharashtra
Schools in Nashik
1937 establishments in India
Educational institutions established in 1937